The Best Worst-Case Scenario is the first album released by Tooth & Nail Records alternative rock band Fair, which features notable musician and record producer Aaron Sprinkle. The album was released on June 6, 2006.

In 2007, the album artwork, designed by Invisible Creature was nominated for a Grammy Award for Best Recording Packaging.

Track listing
 "Monday" – 3:16
 "The Attic" – 4:03
 "Carelessness" – 4:22
 "The Dumbfound Game" – 3:43
 "Pause" – 4:13
 "Grab Your Coat" – 2:16
 "Bide My Crime" – 3:04
 "Get You Out Alive" – 4:06
 "Cut Down Sideways" – 3:47
 "Confidently Dreaming" – 3:32
 "Blurry Eyed" – 3:16
 "Unglued" – 5:14

Album credits
 Produced and Recorded by Aaron Sprinkle and Fair
 Mixed by J.R. McNeely
 Recorded and mixed at Compound Recording, Seattle
 Background vocals on "Unglued" recorded at Rosewood Studios, Tyler, TX
 "Pause" was mixed by J.R. McNeely at Paragon Studios, Franklin, TN
 "Grab Your Coat" was mixed by Aaron Sprinkle at Compound Recording.
 Additional recording and mixes assisted by Aaron Lipinski
 Drum Tech: Aaron Mlasko
 Vocals on "Monday" recorded at Randy Torres
 Masted by Troy Glessner at Spectre Mastering
 Joey Sanchez plays Mlasko quality custom drums
 A&R: josh Jeter & Jeff Carver
 Executive producer: Brandon Ebel
 Art direction & Design: Asterik Studio, Seattle
 All Photography by Greg Lutze

Additional musicians
 Sherri & Stacy DuPree (Eisley) - Vocals on "Unglued"
 John Davis - Vocals & Pedal Steel on "Get You Out Alive"
 Brynn Sanchez - Vocals on "The Attic"
 Lars Katz - Acoustic guitars on "Pause" & "Confidently Dreaming"
 Phil Peterson - Cello & Strings Arrangement on "Blurry Eyed"
 Victoria Parker - Violin on "Blurry Eyed"
 Jesse Sprinkle (Aaron's brother) - Vocals on "Blurry Eyed"
 Matt Carter (Emery) - Stomps on "Pause"

References

2006 debut albums
Tooth & Nail Records albums
Albums produced by Aaron Sprinkle